Mountbolus is a small village in the parish of Killoughey situated at the foot of the Slieve Bloom Mountains in County Offaly, Ireland. 

It has a church, a national (primary) school and one public house. 

The area's GAA club is Kilcormac/Killoughey GAA. When Offaly won the 1998 All-Ireland Senior Hurling Championship, the goalkeeper on the team was Stephen Byrne from the club.

References

External links
 Killoughey Parish website

Towns and villages in County Offaly